Selah is a contemporary Christian vocal trio consisting of Todd Smith, Allan Hall, and Amy Perry. The group has been featured on The 700 Club, Hour of Power, and TBN.

Group history

1997–2004: Original lineup 

Selah was originally formed by brother and sister, Todd and Nicol Smith (now Nicol Sponberg), along with friend Allan Hall. The group quickly gained success with the release of their first album, Be Still My Soul, in 1999. They became known for transforming old Christian hymns into a more modern style and with their powerful voices and beautiful harmonies. Todd and Nicol, who spent their childhood in Subsaharan Africa, brought many African elements to their songs as well. They are as comfortable singing in Kituba, as they are in English. Todd gives credit for his music career to his missionary upbringing. "I've been singing in front of people since I was three," he said. "My parents are missionaries.  When we came back to the United States, we had to visit each church that sponsored us.  That was a good training ground." They also did well-known covers of already-famous songs such as "You Raise Me Up" by Secret Garden and "Bless the Broken Road" by Marcus Hummon. Selah went on to win a Dove Award for their debut album.

Their second album Press On was released in 2001, and also won a Dove Award, along with many nominations for individual songs in the album.

In April 2000, Nicol Smith released her self-titled solo debut on Curb Records. She met and married Greg Sponberg in 2003. Nicol Sponberg released her second solo album, Resurrection (Curb Records), in 2004. The single "Crazy In Love" crossed over to the secular Adult Contemporary charts while songs like "Safe" continued to earn her airplay on Christian radio. Todd also produced a solo album, Alive, in 2004.

2005–present 

Nicol left the group in 2004 to pursue a solo career, and for most of 2005 Melodie Crittenden sang with the group.

The 2006 Bless the Broken Road album was a project that teamed original Selah members Allan Hall and Todd Smith with a wide variety of guest singers.

After auditioning 15 female vocalists, Amy Perry became a full-time member based on her vocal abilities and spirituality. Allan Hall also began to get a more active singing role, from originally being the band's accompanist.

In 2014, Selah released You Amaze Us. The title track debuted at No. 1 on Billboard'''s Christian Soft AC chart, becoming the first song in the history of the chart to do so. "You Amaze Us” spent a concurrent 12 weeks at No. 1 on the Christian Soft AC chart.

In 2014, Amy Perry and Allan Hall also released solo albums – Glory All Around (Perry) and Work of Love (Hall).

 Discography 
Albums
Studio albums

 Compilations 

Singles

 Other appearances Grace, Jim Brickman: "Be Thou Near to Me"Church in the Wildwood: Cherished Hymns'', Gaither Homecoming: "Take My Hand, Precious Lord/Just a Closer Walk With Thee"

Dove Awards and nominations

References

External links 
 

American Christian musical groups
American musical trios
Curb Records artists
Musical groups established in 1997
Word Records artists